The men's singles wheelchair tennis competition at the 1992 Summer Paralympics in Barcelona.

The United States' Randy Snow defeated Germany's Kai Schramayer in the final, 2–6, 6–4, 6–3 to win the inaugural gold medal in men's singles wheelchair tennis at the 1992 Barcelona Paralympics. In the bronze medal match, France's Laurent Giammartini defeated Australia's Michael Connell.

Draw

Key
 INV = Bipartite invitation
 IP = ITF place
 ALT = Alternate
 r = Retired
 w/o = Walkover

Finals

Top half

Bottom half

References 
 

Men's singles